Muhammad Ali was the twelfth Sultan of Brunei. He ruled from 1660 until he was garroted by his successor Abdul Hakkul Mubin in 1661. His death led to the starting of the Brunei Civil War. After his demise, he was locally known as Marhum Tumbang Di Rumput. He was avenged by his son-in-law Muhyiddin who later became the fourteenth Sultan of Brunei.

See also
 List of Sultans of Brunei
 Brunei Civil War

References

17th-century Sultans of Brunei
Year of birth missing
Year of death missing